The Norwegian red deer (Cervus elaphus atlanticus) is a small subspecies   of red deer native to Norway. Today it is farmed on a commercial basis since the 1980s.

References

Cervus
Subspecies